Portsmouth General Hospital is a defunct and demolished hospital formerly in Portsmouth, Virginia, United States.

The hospital began life in 1897 as an eight-room house at 49 Court Street and was named the King's Daughters Hospital Home for the Sick. A year later, its name was changed to the King's Daughters Hospital. It closed in 1999.

References

External links
Portsmouth General Hospital Foundation
"Portsmouth General Hospital to Close: Sad, But For the Best" The Virginian-Pilot, May 11, 1996

Portsmouth, Virginia
Defunct hospitals in Virginia